In type theory, a branch of mathematical logic, in a given typed calculus, the type inhabitation problem for this calculus is the following problem: given a type  and a typing environment , does there exist a -term M such that ?

Relationship to logic 

In the case of simply typed lambda calculus, a type has an inhabitant if and only if its corresponding proposition is a tautology of minimal implicative logic. Similarly, a System F type has an inhabitant if and only if its corresponding proposition is a tautology of intuitionistic second-order logic.

Girard's paradox shows that type inhabitation is strongly related to the consistency of a type system with Curry–Howard correspondence. To be sound, such a system must have uninhabited types.

Formal properties 

For most typed calculi, the type inhabitation problem is very hard. Richard Statman proved that for simply typed lambda calculus the type inhabitation problem is PSPACE-complete. For other calculi, like System F, the problem is even undecidable.

See also 
 Curry–Howard isomorphism

References

Lambda calculus
Type theory